Anagnostaras (1760 in Poliani – May 8, 1825 in Sphacteria) was a Greek revolutionary, a leading member of the Filiki Etaireia, and later a general and War Minister of the Greek War of Independence. Anagnostaras is a nom de guerre, he was born as Christos Papageorgiou and signed as Anagnostis Papageorgiou.

Early years 
Anagnostaras was born in 1760 at the village of Poliani in Messenia; his family originated from the Leontari area of Arcadia. In Russo-Turkish War of 1787-1792, he appeared in the Ionian Islands, together with Christoforos Perraivos and Tzanetos Grigorakis, to serve with the rank of major under the commands of the Greek-Russian general Emmanouil Papadopoulos. In 1803 he moved to the island Zakynthos and starting his military service in the Imperial Russian Army until 1813, when he demobilized and moved to Odessa to ask his arrears of salary.

Activity for the Filiki Etaireia 
At Odessa in 1817, he was initiated into the Filiki Etaireia by Nikolaos Skoufas, became a "priest" and in March 1817 he was sent to Moscow to meet Athanasios Tsakalov, who sent him to the islands of Hydra and Spetses to search for "neophyte" members. Later in the same year went to Constantinople, were he found Papaflessas and initiated him on 21 June 1818, then returned to Zakynthos and initiated Theodoros Kolokotronis on 1 December 1818.

Later he was sent to the Peloponnese to continue his activity, in which paradoxically he used a bouzouki to sing poems of Rigas Feraios and songs of Klephts. The result of his tour was to be elected to the higher grade of "Apostle". Emmanuil Xanthos gave to Anagnostaras the code number 108 for correspondence with the other members of society. He was the first initiated Apostle of the Etaireia, after him were initiated Christoforos Perraivos, Yiannis Pharmakis and Elias Chrysospathis.

Service in the Greek War of Independence 
When the Greek War of Independence began in March 1821, Anagnostaras was present at the Liberation of Kalamata on 23 March 1821, when Greek irregular revolutionary forces took control of the city after the surrender of the Ottoman garrison, without fighting, as a Major under the command of Petrobey Mavromichalis. On 30 September 1821, along with Theodoros Kolokotronis, Kyriakoulis Mavromichalis and Panagiotis Giatrakos, he signed an agreement to confirm the position of the Peloponnesian Senate's members, and they came to rupture with Alexandros Ypsilantis, who eventually retreated. Anagnostaras was promoted to General and became member of the War Commission.

In March 1822, Anagnostaras along with Panagiotis Kefalas and Giatrakos' family supported Georgios Kountouriotis to form a new government at Myloi. In May 1822, after the reshuffles of Second National Assembly at Astros, he became War Minister of the provisional Greek Government.

He fought in the Battle of Valtetsi (May 12, 1821), the Siege of Tripolitsa (September 1821), the Siege of Corinth (December 1821 – January 1822) and many other battles until 8 May 1825 when he was killed in the Battle of Sphacteria.

References

Sources 
 
 
 
 
 
 

1760 births
1825 deaths
Greek military leaders of the Greek War of Independence
Greek military personnel killed in action
Greek generals
Members of the Filiki Eteria
Eastern Orthodox Christians from Greece
Imperial Russian Army personnel
People from Messenia
People from the Peloponnese